Fly is the fourth album by English soprano Sarah Brightman. It is her second album with producer Frank Peterson and features collaborations with Tom Jones, Chris Thompson and Andrew Eldritch. Fly boasts a stronger pop and rock influence than Brightman's previous Broadway and operatic albums, and produced several hits in Europe including "A Question of Honour" and "Time to Say Goodbye".

Since its original 1995 release, Fly is one of Brightman's few albums to undergo multiple reissues in different markets. The first reissue of Fly was in 1996 to include Brightman's hit single "Time to Say Goodbye" with Andrea Bocelli. Fly II, a two-disc limited edition which featured unreleased b-sides and other material, was later released in 2000 to support Brightman's La Luna World Tour and could only be purchased at participating tour events. In 2006, Fly was re-reissued in Japan with the original 1995 track listing, along with four bonus tracks and new artwork. Although Fly is available in several countries, it has yet to be officially released in the United States.

Track listing

1996 re-release

2000 re-release: Fly II (La Luna Tour special limited edition)

Disc 1

Disc 2 – Rare tracks

2006 re-release

Singles
 "A Question of Honour" (1995)
 "Heaven Is Here" (1995)
 "How Can Heaven Love Me" (1995)
 "Time to Say Goodbye" (with Andrea Bocelli) (1996)

Charts and certifications

Weekly charts

Year-end charts

Certifications and sales

References

1995 albums
Sarah Brightman albums
Albums produced by Frank Peterson
East West Records albums